Aureobasidium subglaciale, formerly known as Aureobasidium pullulans var. subglaciale, is a ubiquitous black, yeast-like fungus that is found in very cold habitats. As the name suggests, it was primarily isolated from subglacial ice of arctic glaciers. The species was established when the genomes of the four former varieties of Aureobasidium pullulans were sequenced and the large differences between them were discovered.

The species tolerates up to 10% of NaCl and grows between 4 °C and 25 °C. Colonies on malt extract agar on average grow to 20 mm in 7 days (at 25 °C), appearing smooth and matt pinkish due to abundant sporulation. The reverse is pale orange. Aerial mycelium is absent. Frequently both mycelium and yeast-like cells are present.

The genome of A. subglaciale (as well as other closely related species) contains unusually high numbers of genes for extracellular enzymes for carbohydrate degradation (CAZy) and proteases, MFS membrane sugar transporters, and alkali metal cation transporters (or ion transporters). Genes presumably involved in the synthesis of the biotechnologically important polysaccharide pullulan and siderophores were found, but the gene for antibiotic Aureobasidin A could not be identified. Genes possibly associated with the degradation of plastic and aromatic compounds are also present.

Due to the relatively recent redefinition of the species, most published work does not yet distinguish between the new species belonging to the previously recognised A. pullulans species complex. It is therefore not clear to what extent this knowledge is valid for A. subglaciale.

See also
Aureobasidium melanogenum
Aureobasidium namibiae
Aureobasidium pullulans
Yeast in winemaking

References

External links
 Genome Page on Mycocosm

Yeasts
Dothideales
Fungi described in 2014